Thor Shield is a patented fabric that purports to protect the wearer from tasers or other electroshock weapons. It consists of a polyester fabric, which is bonded to a conductive material that short-circuits electric current from such weapons without involving the body of the wearer.

References

External links

Technical fabrics
Protective gear